Trematosuchoides is an extinct genus of trematosaurid temnospondyl.

References

Trematosaurids